The judiciary of India is a system of courts that interpret and apply the law in the Republic of India. India uses a common law system, first introduced by the British East India Company and with influence from other colonial powers and Indian princely states, as well as practices from ancient and medieval times. The constitution provides for a single unified judiciary in India.

The Indian judicial system is managed and administrated by officers. Judges of Subordinate Judiciaries are appointed by the governor on recommendation by the High Court. Judges of the High Courts and Supreme Court are appointed by the President of India on the recommendation of a collegium.

The judicial system is structured in three levels with subsidiary parts. The Supreme Court, also known as the Apex Court, is the top court and the ultimate appellate court in India. The Chief Justice of India leads that court. High Courts are the top judicial bodies in individual states, controlled and managed by state Chief Justices. Below the High Courts are District Courts, also known as subordinate courts, that are controlled and managed by District and Sessions Judges. The lower subordinate courts are Civil Court and the District Munsif Court, headed by a Sub-Judge. The higher subordinate court, Criminal Court, is headed by Chief Judicial/Metropolitan Magistrate at top and followed by ACJM /ACMM and JM/MM at the lower level.

The Executive and Revenue Courts are managed by the state government through the district magistrate and commissioner, respectively. Although the executive courts are not part of the judiciary, various provisions and judgements empower the High Courts and Session Judges to inspect or direct their operation.

The Ministry of Law and Justice at the Union level is responsible for raising issues before Parliament relating to the judiciary. It has jurisdiction to deal with the issues of any court. It also deals with the appointment of Judges of the High Courts and the Supreme Court. At the state level, the law departments of the states deal with issues regarding the High Court and the Subordinate Courts.

The Constitution and the Judiciary 

The Indian Constitution empowers the Judiciary to act as the Guardian of the Law. A number of provisions deal with the Judiciary's role, power, function, and officer appointments. The major provisions are:
 Part V - Chapter IV - Union Judiciary i.e., Supreme Court - appointment and removal, role and function
 Part VI - Chapter V - High Court - appointment and removal, role and function
 Part VI - Chapter VI- Subordinate Courts - appointment and removal, role and function
 Article 50 - Independence of Judiciary - separates judiciary from executive branch
 Other provisions appear under parts and articles that deal with the court's responsibilities.

The judiciary acts as the arbiter on legal matters. The Inner Conflict of Constitutionalism: Judicial Review and the 'Basic Structure' – India's Living Constitution: Constitution, acts as its watchdog by calling for scrutiny any act of the legislature or the executive from overstepping bounds set for them by the Constitution. It acts as a guardian in protecting the fundamental rights of the people, as enshrined in the Constitution, from infringement by any organ of the state. It also balances the conflicting exercise of power between the centre and a state or among states.

The judiciary is expected to remain unaffected by pressures exerted by other branches of government, citizens or interest groups. Independence of the judiciary is a basic and inalienable feature of the Constitution, One such protection is that no minister can suggest a name to the President, who ultimately appoints judges from a list recommended by the collegium of the judiciary. Judges of the Supreme Court or a High Court cannot be removed from office once appointed, unless a two-thirds majority of members of any of the Houses of the Parliament back the move on grounds of misconduct or incapacity. A person who has been a judge of a court is barred from practising in the jurisdiction of that court.

Appointment
Under Parts V and VI of the Constitution, the President of India appoints Judges of the Supreme Court and High Court with the consent of the Chief Justice. In practice, cultural norms are followed in the appointment of judges to the Supreme Court and High Courts. In accordance with the principles set forth in the Three Judges Cases, the President selects from a list recommended by the collegium  – a closed group consisting of the Chief Justice and the most senior judges of the Supreme Court. Prior to the Three Judges Cases, the President appointed judges upon their recommendation by the Union Cabinet. In 1993, as a result of the Second Judges Case, the executive was given the power to reject a name recommended by the judiciary. The executive has since faced criticism for its decisions relating to this power.

Decisions by the collegium have been the subject of legal scrutiny. In Mahesh Chandra Gupta vs. Union of India and Ors., the court held that who could become a judge was a matter of fact, and that any person therefore had a right to question the court's determination regarding a candidate's qualifications. However, the court also wrote that who should become a judge was a matter of opinion and could not be questioned. As long as a judge's appointment is the subject of a legitimate consultation by the collegium, the content or material it uses to form its opinion cannot be scrutinized by a court.

In contrast to the historical norms concerning Supreme Court and High Court appointments, appointments for Subordinate Court Judges are handled as prescribed under the constitution and other laws and codes. Appointments are generally made by the Public Service Commission of a particular state. However, in some states, the respective High Court can appoint judges of subordinate courts. Regardless of the source of the appointment, the process for the appointment of judges is the same, and is based on the results of a competitive examination. Junior Division civil judges may advance to judicial positions in the Provincial Civil Service, while entry level district judges with at least 7 years of experience can complete the Higher Judicial Service (HJS) exam in order to advance.

History 

The history of jury trials in India dates to the period of European colonisation. In 1665, a petit jury in Madras composed of twelve English and Portuguese jurors acquitted Ascentia Dawes, who was on trial for the murder of her enslaved servant. During the period of Company rule in India, jury trials within dual-court system territories were implemented in Indian territories under East India Company (EIC) control. In Presidency towns (such as Calcutta, Bombay, and Madras), Crown Courts employed juries to judge European and Indian defendants in criminal cases. Outside of Presidency towns, Company Courts staffed by EIC officials judged both criminal and civil cases without the use of a jury.

In 1860, after the British Crown assumed control over the EIC's possessions in India, the Indian Penal Code was adopted. A year later, the Code of Criminal Procedure was adopted. These provisions stipulated that criminal juries were only mandatory in the High Courts of Presidency towns; in all other parts of British India, they were optional and rare. In cases where the defendants were either European or American, at least half of the jury was required to be European or American men, with the justification given that juries in these cases had to be "acquainted with [the defendant's] feelings and dispositions."

During the 20th century, the jury system in British India came under criticism from both colonial officials and independence activists. The system received no mentions in the 1950 Indian Constitution and went unimplemented in many jurisdictions after independence. In 1958, the Law Commission of India recommended its abolition in the fourteenth report that the commission submitted to the Indian government. Jury trials in India were gradually abolished during the 1960s, culminating with the 1973 Criminal Procedure Code, which remained in effect in the 21st century.

Evolution of independent judiciary 

The Sapru Committee Report, published in 1945, considered the judiciary in detail and reiterated what the Government of India Act 1935 had set out: a Federal Court of India would be the forerunner to the Supreme Court. To separate the judiciary from the executive, the Sapru Committee suggested that judges have fixed salaries and tenures, and that they could only be removed for gross misbehaviour. Judges were to be appointed by the president, in consultation with the CJI. The committee appointed to deal with judicial questions as part of the Constituent Assembly in 1946 was influenced by the Sapru Report, though there was concern over the power given to the President. Jawaharlal Nehru, however, supported the Sapru Committee's proposals. In 1949, Nehru said that Constituent Assembly judges ought to be individuals of "the highest integrity," who could "stand up against the executive government, and whoever may come in their way." B. R. Ambedkar emphasised the need for judicial independence stating, "There can be no difference of opinion in the House that our judiciary must both be independent of the executive and must also be competent in itself." Finally, the constitution stated that "Every Judge of the Supreme Court shall be appointed by the President by warrant under his hand and seal after consultation with such of the Judges of the Supreme Court and of the High Courts in the tates as the President may deem necessary for the purpose," given that "in the case of appointment of a Judge other than the Chief Justice, the Chief Justice of India shall always be consulted."

Career progression
Lower-level officers are eligible to progress to any higher judicial rank, including Chief Justice; however, no judicial officer from a subordinate judiciary has achieved that position. Several subordinate officers have reached the rank of Supreme Court Judge. A judicial officer typically begins his or her career as a civil judge in a Court of Judicial Magistrate of First Class. After seven years of experience judges can be appointed to the post of District Judge via a competitive examination. The retirement age for Indian Judicial Officers is 60 years in the Subordinate (District) court, 62 years in the High Court, and 65 in the Supreme Court.

Entry-level positions in the Courts of Judicial Magistrate of First Class are generally considered probationary, or training posts. After completing the probationary assignment, a candidate is posted either as Judicial Magistrate of First Class in the criminal side, or in the District Munsiff Court for civil appointments. Unlike many Indian Union civil service officer positions, judicial roles are mostly field positions. In order to allow officers to diversify their experience, many deputy posts answering to higher judiciary officers were created. Officers are not initially placed in these deputy roles, but after several years of courtroom experience they may receive such an appointment. After five years in the junior division, an officer is eligible to be promoted to Civil Judge (Senior Division).

In 1996, the first National Judicial Pay Commission (NJPC) was created by Supreme Court Justice K.J. Shetty to examine the issues of subordinate judiciaries and set uniform service conditions. The first NJPC introduced the Assured Career Progression (ACP) scheme in order to assure subordinate judicial officers of benefits in the event of delayed career progression. According to the ACP scheme, if an officer's promotion is delayed, after a span of five years of service in their respective grade they are entitled to receive the first stage of the increased ACP pay scale for the next five years. If they are not promoted for another five years, their pay scale under the ACP is increased accordingly. In 2017, the 2nd NJPC revised the pay and service conditions of subordinate judiciaries with the objective to attract talent.

The same methodology is applied at the level of District Judge. After completing the required service in the senior division the High Court, with the consent of the Governor of the respective state, they are eligible for promotion to the cadre of entry level District Judge or Additional District (ADJ) and Session Judge. When District judges are vested with administrative power, they are known as Principal District and Session Judges.

The officers of Junior and Senior division are subordinate to the District and Session Judges and also to CJMs. ADJs are under the general control of their respective high courts. Specific judicial officers are vested with certain special powers as Special Judges or Magistrates to deal with specific matters regarding their areas of practice (e.g. railway, MP-MLA-Ministers, Terrorism, or other specific departments), as needed.

One-third of High Court Judge positions are filled from the Subordinate Judiciary. High Court and Supreme Court Judges are constitutional posts, and have strict processes for appointment that take more time. Several Supreme Court Judges were promoted from the Subordinate Judiciary. Most Judicial officers appointed directly from the bar as a District Judge or in areas of higher judicial service (HJS) have a chance of promotion to the High Court, and potentially to the Supreme Court.

Various departments and ministries were created by state and union government to broaden the experience of judicial officers. State government-created positions range from undersecretary to principal secretary. Union ministries include Deputy Secretary posts, which typically answer to officers in the High Courts and the Supreme Court. Temporary deputy posts for officers of certain judicial rankings provide similar perks and career allowances to comparable civil servants. The most common departments involving deputations of judicial officers at civil secretarial posts are- Law and Justice Ministry, Legal Affairs Department, and Legislative Department.

Judicial hierarchy

Position and Designation held by Judges (in Hierarchy) in their career and Pay Scale

Supreme Court 

The Supreme Court is the highest court established by the Constitution. The Constitution states that the Supreme Court is a federal court, guardian of the Constitution, and the highest court of appeal. Articles 124 to 147 of the Constitution lay down the court's composition and jurisdiction. Primarily, it is an appellate court that takes up appeals against judgments of the High Courts of the states and territories. It also takes writ petitions in cases of serious human rights violations or any petition filed under Article 32, which is the right to a constitutional remedy, or if a serious case involves needs immediate resolution.

The Supreme Court comprises the Chief Justice and 33 judges.

It first sat on 26 January 1950, the day India's constitution came into force, and thereafter delivered more than 24,000 reported judgements.

Proceedings are conducted in English only. The Supreme Court Rules of 1966 were framed under Article 145 of the Constitution, which exists to regulate its practices and procedures. Article 145 was amended and is governed by the Supreme Court Rules of 2013.

High courts 

27 High Courts operate at the state level. Article 141 of the Constitution mandates that they are bound by the judgements and orders of the Supreme Court of India by precedence. These courts have jurisdiction over a state, a union territory or a group of states and union territories. High courts were instituted as constitutional courts under Part VI, Chapter V, Article 214 of the Constitution.

The High Courts are the principal civil courts of original jurisdiction in the state (along with the subordinate District Courts). However, High Courts civil and criminal jurisdiction applies only if subordinate courts are not authorized to try matters for lack of pecuniary or territorial jurisdiction. High Courts may enjoy original jurisdiction in certain matters if so designated in a state or federal law. For example, company law cases are instituted only in a high court.

The primary work of most High Courts consists of deciding appeals from lower courts, and writs in terms of Article 226 of the Constitution. Writ jurisdiction is also an original jurisdiction of High Courts. The precise territorial jurisdiction of each High Court varies by province.

Judges in these courts are appointed by the President after consultation with the Chief Justice of India, Chief Justice of the High Court, and the state governor. The number of judges in a court is decided by dividing the average institution of main cases during the last five years by the national average, or the average rate of disposal of main cases per judge per year in that High Court, whichever is higher.

The Calcutta High Court is the country's oldest, established on 2 July 1862, while the Allahabad High Court is the largest, hosting 160 judges.

High Courts that handle large numbers of cases have permanent benches (or a branch of the court). For litigants of remote regions, 'circuit benches' work on those days when judges visit.

District / Subordinate courts 

The District courts of India are established by state governments for every district or group of districts, taking into account the number of cases and population distribution. These courts are under administrative control of the state's High Court. Decisions are subject to the appeal to the High Court.

The district court is presided over by one District Judge appointed by the Governor with the consultation of High Court. Additional District Judges and Assistant District Judges may be appointee depending on the workload. The Additional District Judge has equivalent jurisdiction as the District Judge. The District Judge is called a "Metropolitan session judge", when he is presiding over a district court in a city which is designated a "Metropolitan area" by the state government.

The district court has appellate jurisdiction over subordinate courts on all matters. Subordinate courts, on the civil side (in ascending order) are Junior Civil Judge Court, Principal Junior Civil Judge Court, Senior Civil Judge Court (also called sub-court). Subordinate courts, on the criminal side (in ascending order) are, Second Class Judicial Magistrate Court, First Class Judicial Magistrate Court, Chief Judicial Magistrate Court. In Family Courts deal with matrimonial disputes.

Family Court and Mahila Court matters are handled by the Principal Judge. The Judges appointed to this post are from the pool of District Judges. In Maharashtra, Andhra Pradesh and some other states, judges are appointed from the pool of retired judicial officer either directly or through exam.

Structure of Civil Courts
Supreme Court of India (appex appellate court)
High Courts (highest appellate court in the states)
Metropolitan area:
 District Courts
 Additional District Courts
Courts of Senior Civil Judges
Courts of Junior Civil Judges
District Level:
District level civil courts is given below (ascending order):
 District Courts
Additional District Court
 Sub Courts (Courts of Subordinate judges)
Additional Sub Courts (Courts of Additional Subordinate judges)
 Munsif Court/ Court of Junior Civil Judge

Structure of Criminal Judiciary
Supreme Court of India (appex appellate court)
High Courts (appex appellate court in the states)
Metropolitan area
Chief Metropolitan Magistrate Courts (CMM)
Courts of Metropolitan Magistrates (MM)

District Level District level Criminal Courts is given below (ascending order):
 District and Sessions Court
Additional Sessions Court
 Assistant Sessions Court
 Chief Judicial Magistrate Court (CJM Court)
Additional Chief Judicial Magistrate Court
Courts of Judicial Magistrate of First Class (JFCM Court)
 Courts of Judicial Magistrate of Second Class

Executive and Revenue Court
Below the judicial hierarchy sits the executive hierarchy. Cr.P.C. empowers the Executive Court to deal with petty offences, but the power does not imply that they hold judicial power. Section 3 of CrPC clearly splits matter to be handled by both magistrates. Section 20 of CrPC empowers the State Government to appoint Executive Magistrates (EM) in every metropolitan area and in every district. It has the authority to appoint one Executive Magistrate as the District Magistrate and to appoint any EM as the ADM. Such a magistrate has the same power as enjoyed by the District Magistrate (DM).

If the office of a DM is left vacant then any officer who temporarily succeeds to the executive administration of the district exercises the same power as enjoyed by the DM. The State Government is empowered to give charge of a sub-division to the EM, who is called Sub-divisional Magistrate. The EM role generally smaintain law and order under section 107–110, 133, 144, 145, and 147 of the CrPC., cancelling or granting licenses, handling land acquisition matters, or any other matter raised by state government.

Section 21 empowers state government to appoint special Executive Magistrates (Sp. EM). Under Section 20(5) of Crpc, the Commissioner of Police (CP) can be appointed as EM, but only when the district is declared by state government as a Commissionerate. The DG(P) holds the rank of CP but can't exercise power of EM (special) until his designation changes into CP. The appeal of executive court lies in the court of Session Judge or Additional Session Judge of the district or to the High Court.

To deal with the land revenue matters, each state established a Revenue Court. These courts adjudicate matters related to:
land revenue
tenancy (ownership - in a loose sense)
property boundaries 
succession
land transfers
partition of holdings
removal of encroachments, eviction of trespassers, and in some states, declaratory suits.
The Revenue Court is a quasi-judicial body and holds only limited power to deal with specific civil matters. As per Section 5(2) of Civil Procedure Code; Revenue Courts have jurisdiction to deal with suits related to rent, revenue or profits of land used for agricultural purposes, but does not include civil court matters. Therefore, certain matters of the Revenue Courts are barred from jurisdiction of Civil Courts as specified under the code. The Court of Additional Commissioner and above are appellate courts. However, it is a state controlled organization. Generally the officers of the rank of Collector and above ar from the pool of the Indian Administrative Service, while lower positions can be from either IAS or SAS and inferior to that are from the State Administrative Services.

Village courts / Panchayat / Rural Court 

Village courts, Lok Adalat (people's court) or Nyaya panchayat (justice of the villages), offer alternative dispute resolution. They were recognized through the 1888 Madras Village Court Act, then developed (after 1935) in various provinces and (after independence) Indian states. The model from

Gujarat State (with a judge and two assessors) was used from the 1970s onwards. In 1984 the Law Commission recommended to create Panchayats in rural areas with laymen ("having educational attainments"). The 2008 Gram Nyayalayas Act had foreseen 5,000 mobile courts in the country for judging petty civil (property cases) and criminal (up to 2 years of prison) cases. However, the Act was not enforced, with only 151 functional Gram Nyayalayas in the country (as of May 2012) against a target of 5000. The major reasons were include financial constraints, reluctance of lawyers, police and other government officials.

Compensation

Supreme Court and High Court Judges 

The President of India, vice-president, Supreme Court and High Court Judges and other constitutional authorities are paid from the Consolidated fund. Two acts deal with SC and HC judge compensation. The Supreme Court Judges (Salaries and Condition) Act deals with the compensation for Supreme Court Judges. The High Court Judges (Salaries and Condition) Act (1954) regulate the compensation of High Court judges. Whenever compensation is amended, the Central Government must present it as a normal bill before Parliament.

Subordinate Judiciary 

NJPC decides the pay scale, allowances, facilities, etc. for subordinate judiciaries throughout the country. This commission was set up by the Government to comply with a Supreme Court order. The recommendations of NJPC, when accepted by the Supreme Court (after hearing any objection of Central or State Govt.), become binding The commission was set up based on recommendations from All Indian Judges Association. The Chief Justice of India recommended that the central government constitute a permanent body to avoid unnecessary delays.

The first NJPC was constituted on 21 March 1996 on the order of Supreme Court in the landmark judgment All India Judges Association v UOI. The commission was headed by Justice K. J. Shetty (Ex- Supreme Court Judge). The commission submitted its report in 1999. It recommended raising the salaries of the subordinate judiciary and fixed their overall compensation. Ten years later, the second NJPC was headed by P.V. Reddi (Ex-Judge SC).

Judicial Academies 

The institute provides training to Subordinate Judiciary officers on topics that State Judicial Academies do not cover. It also offers training to High Court judges of states and judges and judicial officers of other nations. Indian judicial academies:

Issues
According to the World Bank, "although India's courts are notoriously inefficient, they at least comprise a functioning independent judiciary"

Citizens are, after many negative experiences, often unaware of their rights, or resigned to their fate before an inefficient court. Court efficiency is crucial, as a backlog of cases creates opportunities for corruption.

Judiciary Issues have been depicted in several films, such as Court.

Backlog

As of May 2022, India has a sanctioned strength of 25,628 judges with 4.7 crore(47 million) cases pending in judiciary. Nearly 1,82,000 cases have been pending for over 30 years. According to National Judicial Data Grid, Indian courts had 27% rise in backlog between December 2019 and April 2022.

The legal maxim justice delayed is justice denied is honored only in the breach. On average about 20% of approved judicial positions are vacant. The annual backlog increase is less than 2%. If the vacancies were filled, the backlog would decline. Minor infractions make up nearly half of pending cases.

In 2015, some 400 vacancies were reported in the 24 high courts. The Supreme Court backlog is 70,572 as of May 2, 2022. Some 30 million cases await resolution in various courts. The budget allocation is a 0.2 per cent of gross domestic product. The judge-population ratio is 10.5 to one million, about 20% of the recommended 50 to one million.

The government is the largest single litigant, adding cases to the docket, losing most, and then appealing to the next court. The Law Commission found that most such appeals were pointless.

Jagdev claimed that the Judiciary does not attract the best legal talent in part because of disparity in compensation. In recent years scandals have besmirched the judiciary's reputation. The sub-ordinate judiciary works in appalling conditions.

On 12 January 2012, the Supreme Court said that confidence in the judiciary was decreasing, posing a threat to the country. It acknowledged the problems of vacancies in trial courts, unwillingness of lawyers to become judges, and the failure of the apex judiciary in filling vacant HC posts. One proposal is that access to justice must be made a constitutional right requiring the executive to provide the necessary infrastructure for protecting that right. The Court also wanted the Government of India to detail the work being done by the National Mission for Justice Delivery and Legal Reforms.

Undertrials outnumber convicts in the prison population. Ordinary citizens have been imprisioned for espionage for overstaying their visa or straying across international borders, languishing in prison for years due to the slow redressal process. According to Prison Statistics- India 2015, 67.2% of the total prison population of India is under trial, which means they have not yet(by 2015) been convicted by the court.

To reduce pendency, 'Fast-track courts', 'Evening courts/Morning courts' were set up and met with mixed success. Mobile courts were set up to bring 'justice at the doorsteps' of litigants of judge-poor rural areas.

Lok Adalats is an informal, alternative mechanism that has been a success in tackling backlogs, especially in pre-litigation matters, settling cases before they enter the courts.

According to a report released by Centre for Public Policy Research and British Deputy High Commission "a total of 16,884 commercial disputes [are] pending in High Courts with original jurisdiction. Of these Madras High court tops with 5,865. With the number of commercial disputes growing rapidly, facilitating a seamless dispute resolution system through alternate means has become crucial."

Economists Boehm and Oberfeld calculated that the backlog costs the Indian economy several percentage points of GDP.

Judicial corruption
According to Transparency International, judicial corruption in India is attributable to factors such as "delays in the disposal of cases, shortage of judges and complex procedures, all of which are exacerbated by a preponderance of new laws". Corruption has reached the Supreme Court. Notable cases include:
 In April 2017, a judicial Magistrate Debanjan Ghosh gave bail to a murder suspect
 In December 2015, in Darjeeling District an unjustifiably large number of undeserving acquittals and undeserving bails was alleged by then Additional Chief JM.
 In December 2009, legal activist and Supreme Court lawyer Prashant Bhushan stated in court, "out of the last 16 to 17 Chief Justices, half have been corrupt" In November 2010, former Law Minister, Shanti Bhushan echoed Prashant Bhushan's claim.
 There have been allegations that judges with doubtful integrity were elevated within the higher judiciary and campaigns held for their impeachment.
 In 2011, Soumitra Sen, former judge at the Calcutta High Court became the first judge in the India to be impeached by the Rajya Sabha for misappropriation of funds.
 In November 2011, a former Supreme Court Justice Ruma Pal slammed the higher judiciary for what she called the seven sins. She listed the sins as:
 Turning a blind eye to the injudicious conduct of a colleague.
 Hypocrisy – the distortion of the norm of judicial independence.
Secrecy – lack of transparency in the appointment of judges to the High and Supreme Court 
Plagiarism and prolixity – SC judges often lift whole passages from earlier decisions without acknowledgement – and use long-winded, verbose language
Arrogance – the higher judiciary has claimed superiority and independence to mask their own indiscipline and transgression of norms and procedures
Professional arrogance – judges arrive at decisions of grave importance ignoring precedent or judicial principle
Nepotism – wherein favours are sought and dispensed by some judges.

Representation in Judiciary

Around 50% of the judges of high courts and 33% judges in the Supreme Court are family members of those in higher echelons of judiciary. Supreme Court has a sanctioned strength of 31 judges, out of which six judges were sons of former judges and appointments of over 88 judges from 13 high courts who were either born to a family of lawyers, judges, or worked under some legal luminaries.  Union Minister of State, HRD, Upendra Kushwaha notes that only 250-300 families have sent judges to Supreme Court and there is negligible representation of women and Scheduled Castes in higher judiciary.

E-Courts Mission Mode Project 
The E-courts project was established in 2005. All courts were to get computerised. As per the project in 2008, all the District courts were initialised under the project. In 2010, all District courts were computerised. Digital services began in the Supreme Court in June 2011. The case lists and the judgements of most district courts were available Data is updated daily. Most District and Taluka Courts in the country are computerised. Cause list of each of the Court are available.

Judicial service centres are available for all courts. The public assess case status, stage and next hearing dates.

See also 
 Law of India
 Constitution of India
 Indian Penal Code
 Three Judges Cases
 Supreme Court of India
 Minister of Law and Justice
 Law enforcement in India
 Code of Criminal Procedure (India)
 Pendency of court cases in India
 List of Acts of the Parliament of India
 National Judicial Appointments Commission
 Sections of the Indian Penal Code
 List of amendments of the Constitution of India

References

Further reading
Justice can be delivered in reasonable time
 Judicial delay may become a thing of the past
 National policy and action plan for implementation of IT in the Indian judiciary
 Has India failed because of its Judicial System?
 e-courts in India still a distant dream

 
Law of India
Supreme Court of India